Tapurla is a village in Kuusalu Parish, Harju County in northern Estonia, on the territory of Lahemaa National Park. It is located on the Juminda Peninsula.

References

Villages in Harju County